= Camp To Belong =

US-based non-profit organization

Camp To Belong International is a non-profit organization whose mission is to reunite brothers and sisters who are placed in separate foster homes and other forms of out of home care. The emphasis is on providing opportunities for siblings to maintain connections through recreational and emotionally supportive environments. Camp To Belong also seeks to educate others about the plight of foster siblings and the importance of keeping them together in foster care, and/or adoption whenever possible and advocates for policies and practices that support sibling relationships.

Camp To Belong International was founded in 1995 by Lynn Price, who was separated from her sister while in foster care. She learned at the age of 8 years that she had a biological sibling; however, their contact throughout childhood was limited. As an adult, she advocated for sibling rights and held the first camp for siblings separated in foster care in Las Vegas, Nevada. As of 2012, Camp To Belong provides camping and other recreational activities to siblings in the United States and Australia.
